The 2014 Singapore League Cup was the eighth season of Singapore's premier club football tournament organised by Football Association of Singapore, and also known as the 2014 StarHub League Cup for sponsorship reasons.

For the second year in succession, National Football League clubs will participate in the tournament. Unlike the previous season where NFL sides had to compete in play-offs to earn the right to represent the league against the professionals, the representatives in this edition qualified through the league positions from last season.

The 2014 Singapore League Cup plate final was played between Tampines Rovers and Balestier Khalsa at the Jalan Besar Stadium in Kallang, Singapore. Miljan Mrdaković, who scored a hat-trick in the semi-finals against Police Sports Association, reproduced another hat-trick to clinch the plate for Tampines. He becomes the first player in history to score two hat-tricks in the tournament, and consecutively.

The 2014 Singapore League Cup final was played between Tanjong Pagar United and Brunei DPMM at the Jalan Besar Stadium in Kallang, Singapore. Brunei DPMM eliminated Tanjong Pagar United by a score of 2–0 to lift the League Cup trophy.

Teams
The top ten clubs from 2013 S.League were divided into three pots based on their final league positions. Developmental sides Harimau Muda and Young Lions have opted out of participation in this year's edition as they will be on a training tour in Austria. League positions of the previous season are shown in parentheses.

 Police SA and Singapore Recreation Club are clubs from the NFL. They finished champions and runners-up respectively in the first division.

Round and draw dates
The schedule of the competition was as follows. The draw took place on 20 June at the Jalan Besar Stadium, during which the teams were drawn by various club representatives.

Format
The preliminary phase was a competition between the 12 teams divided among four groups of three, where each group engaged in a round-robin tournament within itself. The two highest ranked teams in each group advanced to the knockout phase. The third-placed team in each group entered the plate knockout phase. Teams were awarded 3 points for a win and one for a draw.

Tie-breaking criteria for group play

The ranking of teams in each group was based on the following criteria:
 Number of points
 Goal difference 
 Number of goals scored
 Head-to-head record between tied teams 
 Drawing of lots

The knockout phase involved the eight teams that qualified from the preliminary phase of the tournament, while the plate knockout phase involved the four teams that finished third in the preliminary phase of the tournament. For the knockout phase, there were three rounds of matches, with each round eliminating half of the teams entering that round, whereas for the plate knockout phase, there were two rounds of matches, with each round eliminating half of the teams entering that round. For each game in the knockout phase, a draw was followed by thirty minutes of extra time (except the final); if scores were still level there would be a penalty shoot-out to determine who progressed to the next round.

Preliminary phase
The preliminary phase began on 7 July and will conclude on 15 July. There were some changes to the fixtures released.

Changes to fixtures
 Group B: Tampines Rovers v Warriors was postponed from 10 July to 12 July due to technical faults.
 Group C: Home United v Singapore Recreation Club has been postponed from 11 July to 14 July.
 Group C: Woodlands Wellington v Singapore Recreation Club was brought forward from 14 July, 8pm to 11 July, 8.15pm.

All times listed below are in Singaporean official time (UTC+8).

Group A

Group B

Group C

Updated to games played on 11 July 2014.

Group D
{|
|-
|

Knockout phase
The knockout phase involved the eight teams that qualified from the preliminary phase of the tournament. There are three rounds of matches, with each round eliminating half of the teams entering that round. The successive rounds were: quarter-finals, semi-finals, and final. For each game in the knockout phase, a draw was followed by thirty minutes of extra time (except the final); if scores were still level there would be a penalty shoot-out to determine who progressed to the next round.

Quarter-finals

Semi-finals

Final

Plate knockout phase
The plate knockout phase involved the four teams that finished third in the preliminary phase of the tournament. There are two rounds of matches, with each round eliminating half of the teams entering that round. The successive rounds were: semi-finals and final. For each game in the plate knockout phase, a draw was followed by thirty minutes of extra time (except the final); if scores were still level there would be a penalty shoot-out to determine who progressed to the next round.

Plate semi-finals

Plate final

Statistics

Goalscorers
6 goals

  Miljan Mrdaković (TAM)

4 goals

  Goran Ljubojević (BAL)
  Roy O'Donovan (DPMM)
  Firdaus Idros (TPU)

3 goals

  Kazuki Sakamoto (ALB)
  Kazuya Okazaki (ALB)
  Norihiro Kawakami (ALB)
  Rodrigo Tosi (DPMM)
  Ahmad Latiff (TPU)
  Agu Casmir (WAR)

2 goals

  Itsuki Yamada (ALB)
  Adi Said (DPMM)
  Hafiz Nor (GLI)
  Leonel Felice (GLI)
  Lee Kwan-woo (HOM)
  Geison Moura (HOU)
  Jake Butler (TAM)
  Jozef Kapláň (TAM)
  Noh Alam Shah (TAM)
  Monsef Zerka (TPU)
  Sébastien Etiemble (TPU)
  Chang Jo-yoon (WLW)

1 goal

  Kaoru Nishio (ALB)
  Kazuya Fukuzaki (ALB)
  Keisuke Ota (ALB)
  Boris Raspudić (DPMM)
  Fuad Ramli (GLI)
  Kento Fukuda (GLI)
  Mustaqim Manzur (GLI)
  Thorsten Schneider (GLI)
  Bruno Castanheira (HOM)
  Fazli Ayob (HOM)
  Indra Sahdan Daud (HOM)
  Kwon Da-kyung (HOM)
  Sirina Camara (HOM)
  Qiu Li (HOM)
  Yasir Hanapi (HOM)
  Diego Olivera (HOU)
  Faiz Salleh (HOU)
  Nurhilmi Jasni (HOU)
  Daniel Razali (PSA)
  Ang Zhiwei (TAM)
  Chris van Huizen (TAM)
  Mustafić Fahrudin (TAM)
  Asraf Rashid (TPU)
  Bah Mamadou (WLW)

Own goals

  Abdul Aziz (DPMM) for ALB
  Joe Gamble (DPMM) for ALB
  Neezam Aziz (WAR) for GLI

Source:

Hat-tricks

See also
 S.League
 Singapore FA Cup
 Singapore Cup
 Singapore Charity Shield
 Football Association of Singapore
 List of football clubs in Singapore

References

 

2014
League Cup
2014 domestic association football cups
July 2014 sports events in Asia